Humphrey Lloyd (by 1498 – 1562 or later) was a Welsh politician.

He was a Member (MP) of the Parliament of England for Montgomeryshire in 1545 and 1547.

References

15th-century births
16th-century deaths
16th-century Welsh politicians
Members of the Parliament of England (pre-1707) for constituencies in Wales
English MPs 1545–1547
English MPs 1547–1552